This is a list of the major UK literary agencies, by order of the year of their establishment, including selected notable clients.

Literary agencies

See also
 List of largest UK book publishers

References

Literary agencies
Literary Agencies (Uk)
Literary Agencies (Uk)
British literary agencies
Talent and literary agencies